Krystal Forgesson  (born 7 September 1982) is a New Zealand field hockey player. She has competed for the New Zealand women's national field hockey team (the Black Sticks Women) since 2005, including for the team at the 2006, 2010 and 2014 Commonwealth Games, and at the 2008 and 2012 Summer Olympics.

In the 2016 New Year Honours, Forgesson was appointed a Member of the New Zealand Order of Merit for services to hockey.

References

External links
 

1982 births
Living people
New Zealand female field hockey players
Olympic field hockey players of New Zealand
Field hockey players at the 2008 Summer Olympics
Field hockey players at the 2012 Summer Olympics
Field hockey players at the 2010 Commonwealth Games
Field hockey players at the 2014 Commonwealth Games
Commonwealth Games silver medallists for New Zealand
Commonwealth Games bronze medallists for New Zealand
Members of the New Zealand Order of Merit
Commonwealth Games medallists in field hockey
21st-century New Zealand women
Medallists at the 2010 Commonwealth Games
Medallists at the 2014 Commonwealth Games